Kents is a hamlet in the parish of Jacobstow, Cornwall, England.

References

Hamlets in Cornwall